Despedida or La Despedida - the Spanish word meaning "Farewell" - may refer to:

Film and TV
La despedida, a 1957 Argentinian film directed by Miguel Morayta
La despedida, a 2012 Argentinian film directed by Juan Manuel D'Emilio

Music
 "Despedida," a song by the Mexican composer María Grever (1885–1951)
 "Despedida" (Julieta Venegas song), 2010
 "Despedida" (Shakira song), 2008
 "Despedida", a song by José Miguel Class
 "Despedida", a standard on the Rolando Villazón album ¡México!
 "Despedida", a song by Odilio González
 "Despedida", a song by composer Pedro Flores
 "De Despedida", a song by La Trampa from their 2003 album Frente a Frente (Live at Talleres de Don Bosco)
 "La Despedida", a song by Puerto Rican reggaeton singer Daddy Yankee
 "La Despedida", by the French singer Manu Chao in his Clandestino solo album

See also
Despedida de casada, a 1968 Mexican film
Despedida de Solteiro, a 1992 Brazilian soap opera, starring João Vitti, Gabriela Alves and Rita Guedes
Despedida de Solteros, a 2011 Spanish-language play starring Tito Speranza
"Despedida de Soltero", a song by Spanish band Gran Baobab for their 2009 Eurovision Song Contest entry